Taxi! Taxi! is a 2013 Singaporean comedy film based on the 2010 work Diary Of A Taxi Driver by Cai Mingjie, said to be "Singapore's most well-educated taxi-driver". Directed by Kelvin Sng and produced by Chan Pui Yin and Chan Yan Yan for SIMF Management, the film stars Gurmit Singh, Mark Lee and YouTube personality Chua Jin Sen, better known by his online handle "Dr. Jia Jia". It is Chua's professional film debut. The film follows two fellow taxi-drivers' (Lee and Singh) quest for self-discovery. Distributed by Golden Village Pictures, the film was commercially released in Singapore on January 3, 2013 and slated for a January 24, 2013 release in Malaysia.

Plot
In the film's prelude, PhD microbiologist Professor Chua See Kiat (Gurmit Singh) is hanging out on a rooftop when a taxi driver named Lee Ah Tau (Mark Lee) mistook him for attempting suicide. This leads to Ah Tau receiving a fine for illegal parking.

After several attempts to find a new job, Prof Chua had no choice but to resort to cab driving. Ah Tau volunteers to help him and became his first passenger. Soon, Ah Tau was then fined again for another illegal parking incident.

When Prof Chua was picking his mother-in-law from the airport, he happened to get into a taxi that was driven by Ah Tau, whose son was also in the taxi. Ah Tau then started talking about Prof Chua's new career as a taxi driver, almost revealing it to his wife and mother-in-law who were not aware of this beforehand. This caused a strain on Prof Chua and Ah Tau's friendship.

The movie shows the difficulties encountered by Prof Chua as he faces difficult customers including one that refused to pay their taxi fare. Ah Tau helps him by recording the scene and gets himself punched by the gangsters. The gangsters are then caught and Prof Chua gives Ah Tau a mobile phone to thank him. However he is yet to face his wife who is crying. He then explains the situation to her as she promises not to tell anyone about his new job.

Prof Chua's son Jonah Chua finds out about his taxi driving when the latter inadvertently picked him and his girlfriend up as passengers. Jonah decides not to talk to his father. Ah Tau also gets into a family scuffle for showing his son Lee Jia Jia edited pictures of his long lost mother. Jia Jia realizes that Ah Tau and Regina had both edited it, causing Jia Jia to stop talking to his father. The two share their grievances and decide to help each other in the future. The next day, Prof Chua finds his mum missing from the house and decides to mobilise all the taxi drivers to find her successfully, giving him a better understanding of the 'taxi culture'. Prof Chua also helps Ah Tau by improving his son Jia Jia with his English and tries to find a suitable school for him.

While Ah Tau sets a date with Regina, he is caught by a police officer (Chua En Lai) who gives a longwinded 'speech' about the perils of an illegal U-turn. His taxi runs out of fuel and he is forced to take another taxi before being caught by the same policeman as he repeats the same 'speech'. Regina feels that Ah Tau isn't worth the wait and stomps off into the streets, leading into a car accident. While she is in hospital, she finds out that her vision was impaired and she is unable to fulfill her dream to be a fashion designer. This leads to her attempting suicide on the hospital's roof. Prof Chua explains the situation Regina is in to Ah Tau, who is in the middle of his son's performance. While he is on his way, Prof Chua tells Regina his story of being a cab driver, which then calms her down and changes her mind about the suicide. It is recorded as his son watches it live.

A few years later, Jonah begins idolizing his father again. While Prof Chua regains his job as a professor, he still wants to continue his taxi driving. Regina became a DJ as she falls in love with Ah Tau. The film ends with Prof Chua and Ah Tau driving off into the sunset.

Cast
 Gurmit Singh as Professor Chua See Kiat,  a retrenched microbiologist
 Mark Lee as Lee Ah Tau, a veteran Ah Beng taxi driver
 Royston Ong as Jonah Chua, Chua See Kiat's son
 Jazreel Low as Chua See Kiat's wife. Director Kelvin Sng stated that he chose her for the role as:

 Lai Meng as Chua See Kiat's mother-in-law
 Chua Jin Sen as Lee Jia Jia, Lee Ah Tau's son. It is his film debut. Sng said of him:

 Chua En Lai as a police officer
 Gan Mei Yan as Lee Ah Tau's tenant, Regina.

Production

Development
Inspiration was largely drawn from real life blogger Cai Mingjie's personal recounts in his 2010 best selling work, Diary of a Taxi Driver: True Stories From Singapore's Most Educated Cabdriver. Boris Boo, Lee Chee Tian and Violet Lai served as screenwriters. Boo, Rebecca Leow, Chan and Sng were credited with writing the story. Chua Jin Sen (better known as Dr Jia Jia)'s involvement in the project kindled public interest. His participation in the film was first mentioned by his mother in June 2012, who told Yahoo! Singapore:

She also gave some details about his role, but a confidentiality agreement prevented her from stating more at that time. Greater details about the film were disclosed at a July 2012 press conference, where director Kelvin Sng said [relating to Chua's role]:

Taxi! Taxi! is the first on-screen pairing of Gurmit Singh and Mark Lee since their 2001 collaboration, One Leg Kicking. Singh attributed this to the "lack of suitable scripts". It is Singh's first feature-length film since Phua Chu Kang The Movie (2010). Taxi! Taxi! also marks the comeback of former actress Jazreel Low.

Financing and filming
Financiers for Taxi! Taxi! included SIMF Management, Galaxy Entertainment, sglanded.net, Widescreen Media, RAM Entertainment and PMP Entertainment. With a budget of S$1 million, production commenced on July 12, 2012. Actual filming begun on July 16, 2012. A particular scene required Chua to be shot from various angles, resulting in many takes. This reportedly made Chua feel frustrated. His mother said of the scenario:

Reception

Box office
Commercially released in Singaporean cinemas on January 3, 2013, Taxi! Taxi! grossed S$592,000 in its opening weekend. In total it took in $1.45 million, making it the second-highest grossing Singaporean film of 2013, after Ah Boys to Men 2.

Critical response
Film magazine F*** Raphael Lim dubbed the film as "run of the mill", giving it only 2 out of 5 stars. Writing for my paper was Boon Chan, who gave the film a rating of 2.5. He wrote that "their [Lee and Singh's] much-vaunted chemistry has been overhyped."

Awards and nominations
Taxi! Taxi! was chosen as Singapore's first official entry for the 1st Asean International Film Festival and Awards (Abbreviation: AIFFA) 2013, to be held in Kuching, Sarawak, Malaysia, from March 28–30, 2013.

See also

References

Chinese-language films
Films shot in Singapore
Singaporean comedy films
2010s English-language films